Deborah is a feminine given name derived from דבורה D'vorah, a Hebrew word meaning "bee". Deborah was a prophetess in the Old Testament Book of Judges. In the United States, the name was most popular from 1950 to 1970, when it was among the 20 most popular names for girls. It was the 25th most common name for women in the United States in the 1990 census. It has since fallen in popularity. It ranked as the 780th most popular name for baby girls born in 2007 in the United States, down from 676th most popular name in 2006.

The name is Déborah in French, Débora in Portuguese and Spanish, Debora in Italian and Czech, and Δεββώρα or Δεβόρα in Greek.

Variants
Deb (English)
DebDeb (Australian English)
Debbo (Australian English)
Debster (Australian English)
Debb (English)
Debbi (English) 
Debbie (English)
Debby (English)
Debbey (English)
Debbee (English)
Debie (English)
Deby (English)
Debi (English)
Debey (English)
Debee (English)
Deborha (Amharic)
Dibora (Amharic)
Debra (English)
Debora (English)
Debbra (English)
Devorah (Hebrew)
Dvorah (Hebrew)

Notable people

Notes

English feminine given names
Greek feminine given names
Hebrew feminine given names
Jewish feminine given names